This article is the match statistics of the South Korea national under-23 football team.

Results by year

1990s

2000s

2010s

2020s

Non-international matches
The following matches are non-international matches against clubs, regional teams, and other KFA teams, but these are being included in player records of the KFA website.

See also
South Korea national under-23 football team

References

External links
 South Korea U-23 (Olympic) Matches - Details 1991-1999 at Yansfield
 South Korea U-23 (Olympic) Matches - Details 2000-2004 at Yansfield
 Men's U-23 Squads & Results at KFA